The 27th Critics' Choice Awards were presented on March 13, 2022, at the Fairmont Century Plaza Hotel in Los Angeles, California and the Savoy Hotel in London, honoring the finest achievements of filmmaking and television programming in 2021. The ceremony was simulcast on The CW and TBS, and hosted by Taye Diggs and Nicole Byer; this was Diggs' fourth consecutive time as host. The television nominations were announced on December 6, 2021. The film nominations were announced on December 13, 2021.

Belfast and West Side Story led the film nominations with 11 each, followed by Dune and The Power of the Dog with 10 apiece. Succession led the television nominations with eight, followed by Evil and Mare of Easttown with five each. Overall, Netflix received a total of 42 nominations, 24 for film and 18 for television, the most for any studio or network for the fifth year in a row.

On December 22, 2021, the ceremony, originally slated for January 9, 2022, was delayed due to COVID-19 pandemic-related concerns—involving the Omicron variant widespread surge in the United States. On January 13, 2022, it was announced that the ceremony would take place on March 13, 2022.

Winners and nominees

Film

#SeeHer Award
 Halle Berry

Lifetime Achievement Award
 Billy Crystal

Television

Films with multiple nominations and wins
The following twenty-two films received multiple nominations:

The following five films received multiple awards:

Television programs with multiple nominations and wins
The following programs received multiple nominations:

The following programs received multiple awards:

See also
 2nd Critics' Choice Super Awards
 6th Critics' Choice Documentary Awards

References

External links
 'The Power of the Dog' and 'Ted Lasso' lead winners at the 27th Annual Critics Choice Awards at Critics Choice Association

Broadcast Film Critics Association Awards
2022 in London
2021 film awards
2022 in Los Angeles
March 2022 events in the United States
March 2022 events in the United Kingdom
C
Events postponed due to the COVID-19 pandemic